General elections were held in Liechtenstein in July 1906.

Electors 
Electors were selected through elections that were held between 18 and 21 July. Each municipality had two electors for every 100 inhabitants.

Results 
The election of Oberland's Landtag members and substitutes was held on 28 July in Vaduz. Of Oberland's 118 electors, 115 were present. Oberland elected seven Landtag members and three substitutes.

The election of Unterland's Landtag members and substitutes was held on 30 July in Mauren. Of Unterland's 74 electors, 73 were present. Unterland elected five Landtag members and two substitute.

References 

Liechtenstein
1906 in Liechtenstein
Elections in Liechtenstein
July 1906 events